Leo Fisher may refer to:

Leo Fisher (Shameless)
Leo Fisher (Once and Again)

See also
Leo Fischer, sportswriter
Lee Fisher, politician